The CZW World Junior Heavyweight Championship was a professional wrestling junior heavyweight championship owned by the Combat Zone Wrestling (CZW) promotion. The championship was created and debuted on February 19, 1999 at CZW's Opening Night event. Only wrestlers under the junior heavyweight weight limit of  may hold the championship. Being a professional wrestling championship, the title is won via a scripted ending to a match or awarded to a wrestler because of a storyline.

Overall, there have been 37 reigns shared among 26 wrestlers, with two vacancies. The inaugural champion was The Sensational One, who was recognized as champion at CZW's Opening Night event. Sabian and Trent Acid are tied for the record of most reigns, with three each. At  days, Adam Cole's only reign is the longest in the title's history. Cole holds the record for most days as champion as well. The Sensational One's first reign, along with Sami Callihan and Sonjay Dutt's second reigns share the record for shortest reign at less than one day. The title was retired on September 8, 2012, when reigning champion A. R. Fox defeated CZW Wired TV Champion Dave Crist in a ladder match to unify the two titles, but the Junior Heavyweight Championship was revived on August 23, 2014.

History
The first champion was crowned on February 19, 1999 at CZW's first show, Opening Night. The Sensational One was recognized as champion by CZW. He went on to defend the title that night against Quicksilver, who defeated him to become the new champion. As such, The Sensational One's first reign became the shortest reign in the title's history at less than one day, until September 9, 2006 when Sonjay Dutt defeated SeXXXy Eddy at CZW's Chri$ Ca$h Memorial Show – Down With The Sickness 2 event to become the new champion. Dutt then went on to lose the title to Jigsaw later that day at CZW's Expect the Unexpected show.

The title has changed hands four times outside of the United States. During Trent Acid's first reign, he was defeated by Winger in Tokyo, Japan on July 1, 2000 to mark the first instance. The second was also in Tokyo, with Men's Teioh becoming the new champion on September 15, 2000. The third was in Sapporo, Japan on May 4, 2001, while the fourth was in Yokohama, Japan on August 19, 2001. Jun Kasai won the title in Sapporo, while Acid reclaimed the title in Yokohama.

Following Acid's victory in Yokohama, the title was vacated for the first of two times. The vacancy was the result of a double pinfall in a match against Ruckus for the championship on September 29, 2001 at CZW's Enough is Enough event. Ruckus went on to win the vacant title in a Three Way match that also involved Acid and Winger on December 2, 2001. The second vacancy was the result of CZW stripping Chuck Taylor of the title on October 11, 2008. Ryan McBride became the new champion on December 13, 2008 at CZW's Cage Of Death 10: Ultraviolent Anniversary show by defeating Pinkie Sanchez, Carter Gray, Egotistico Fantastico, and Dan Paysan in a Ultraviolent Tables, Ladders, and Chairs match to win the vacant championship.

On May 8, 2010 at CZW's Fist Fight event, Adam Cole defeated then-CZW Junior Heavyweight Champion Sabian to become the new champion. Cole held the title for 553 days, the longest reign on record, before losing it to Sami Callihan on November 12, 2011 at CZW's Night Of Infamy 10: Ultimatum event. However, since August 23, 2014, Alexander James defended the title at CZW's events.

Reigns

Combined reigns

References
General

Specific

External links
CZWrestling.com

1999 in professional wrestling
Combat Zone Wrestling championships
Junior heavyweight wrestling championships
Hardcore wrestling championships